The PR3 mixed coxed four competition at the 2019 World Rowing Championships took place at the Linz-Ottensheim regatta venue. A top-eight finish ensured qualification for the Tokyo Paralympics.

Schedule
The schedule was as follows:

All times are Central European Summer Time (UTC+2)

Results

Heats
The two fastest boats in each heat advanced directly to the A/B semifinals. The remaining boats were sent to the repechages.

Heat 1

Heat 2

Heat 3

Repechages
The three fastest boats in each repechage advanced to the A/B semifinals. The remaining boats were sent to the C final.

Repechage 1

Repechage 2

Semifinals
The three fastest boats in each semi advanced to the A final. The remaining boats were sent to the B final.

Semifinal 1

Semifinal 2

Finals
The A final determined the rankings for places 1 to 6. Additional rankings were determined in the other finals.

Final C

Final B

Final A

References

2019 World Rowing Championships